Take Penacilin Now is a 2005 compilation album released on G7 Welcoming Committee Records. The compilation features almost every artist that has released material on the label. It features a new exclusive track from Propagandhi, unreleased tracks from Randy, The Weakerthans, Greg MacPherson, Submission Hold, Mico, Rhythm Activism, and Hiretsukan, and rare tracks from Warsawpack, Clann Zú, and Malefaction.

The title's misspelling of penicillin is intentional; it derives from the letter to the New York Post that accompanied the 2001 anthrax attacks in New York City and Washington, DC. The cover, an image of the envelope that was sent to Senator Tom Daschle, is taken from the same series of attacks.

Track listing

 Swallowing Shit, "If Assholes Could Fly, This Place Would Be an Airport"
 Warsawpack, "We Conquer"
 Clann Zú, "An Bád Dubh"
 Bakunin's Bum, "How Far Are You Willing To Go?"
 Consolidated, "Fractured Fairytales"
 Submission Hold, "Democratie"
 Greg MacPherson, "Southern Lites"
 Propagandhi, "Name and Address Withheld"
 Mico, "Halfway State"
 Randy, "Losing My Mind"
 ...But Alive, "Korrect"
 I Spy, "Just Between Friends"
 GFK, "Prison of Life"
 Malefaction, "Real Beauty Cannot Be Photographed"
 Che: Chapter 127, "The Choicelessness Parade"
 Rhythm Activism, "Down in the Mines"
 Hiretsukan, "Song for Willhelmina Vautrin"
 The (International) Noise Conspiracy, "Ever Felt Cheated?"
 The Weakerthans, "My Favourite Power Chords"

External links
 Promotional website for Take Penacilin Now

Record label compilation albums
G7 Welcoming Committee Records albums
2005 compilation albums
Compilation albums by Canadian artists